United Nations Security Council resolution 1433, adopted unanimously on 15 August 2002, after recalling 696 (1991) and subsequent resolutions on the situation in Angola, particularly 1268 (1999), the Council authorised the establishment of the United Nations Mission in Angola (UNMA) as a follow-on mission to the United Nations Office in Angola (UNOA). Resolution 1433 was adopted on the same day the Council extended the suspension of travel restrictions against UNITA officials in Resolution 1432 (2002).

Resolution

Observations
The Security Council reaffirmed the need for the full implementation of the Lusaka Protocol and other agreements, and supported adjustments to the mandate of UNOA. It viewed the United Nations presence in Angola as necessary to contribute to the consolidation of peace through the promotion of political, military,
human rights, humanitarian and economic goals.

Acts
UNMA was established for an initial period of six months until 15 February 2003 and would be headed by the Special Representative of the Secretary-General. Its mandate would include provisions for assisting the parties to conclude the Lusaka Protocol, and to assist the Angolan government by:

(a) the protection and promotion of human rights, consolidation of peace and enhancement of the rule of law;
(b) providing assistance in demining activities;
(c) co-ordinating assistance to vulnerable groups;
(d) reintegration of demobilised soldiers;
(e) promotion of economic recovery;
(f) mobilise resources from the international community;
(g) providing electoral assistance to the Angolan government.

A child protection adviser was also approved. Finally, the Secretary-General Kofi Annan was requested to submit an interim report within 3 months on the work of UNMA.

See also
 Angolan Civil War
 List of United Nations Security Council Resolutions 1401 to 1500 (2002–2003)

References

External links
 
Text of the Resolution at undocs.org

 1433
2002 in Angola
 1433
August 2002 events